Cruz Azul is a Honduran football club based in San José de Colinas, Honduras. The club currently plays in Liga de Ascenso de Honduras. Is a copy of Sport Club "Cruz Azul" from League MX, Mexico. This is not the first time that Honduras' soccer team copy to Mexico's soccer team.

Achievements
Liga de Ascenso
Runners-up (1): 2006–07 C

Current squad

Football clubs in Honduras